The Bailey, or The Peninsula, is a historic area in the centre of Durham, England. It is a peninsula within a sharp meander in the River Wear, formed by isostatic adjustment of the land. The name 'The Bailey' derives from it being the 'outer bailey' of the Norman motte and bailey-style Durham Castle. Access to the area is restricted by the Durham City congestion charge, which started in 2002 and is the UK's oldest such scheme.

Terminology
The peninsula is usually taken to mean the entire area within the bend of the river, that is, the historic Durham Cathedral and Castle, Palace Green, North Bailey, South Bailey and Durham Market Square. Bailey is often used to refer to this whole area, and the five Durham University colleges in this area, (University College, Hatfield College, St Chad's College, St John's College and St Cuthbert's Society) are often labelled Bailey Colleges. However, Bailey often refers more precisely to two streets, North Bailey and South Bailey, that run along the peninsula.

South Bailey begins close to St Cuthbert's, near to Prebends Bridge, at the southern tip of the peninsula. It is cobbled and flanked by numerous old buildings, many of which are owned by the Cathedral and University. Running northwards, South Bailey becomes North Bailey at the gate into "the College", an enclosed square containing the houses of the Cathedral's Dean and Canons as well as the Chorister School.  North Bailey continues, and is flanked by three colleges, as well as numerous university subject departments. Some of these buildings are more modern in origin. The North Bailey ends at its junction with Owengate, which leads up onto Palace Green.

The remainder of the peninsula is centred around Durham Market Place. Saddler Street is borne out of Owengate and North Bailey, continuing downhill to the Market Place. Elvet Bridge leads over to Elvet, the eastern part of Durham city centre, and is now pedestrianised. The Market Place itself is centred on a statue of Lord Londonderry. Saddler Street enters at its south-east corner, whilst Silver Street falls away to the south-west towards Framwellgate Bridge. St Nicholas' Church, Durham lies to the north of the Market Place, alongside the exit from Durham's Congestion Charge Zone onto Claypath. The dual carriageway A690 forms a northern border to the peninsula area.

History
With steep cliffs and the River Wear on three sides, Durham's peninsula has long been recognised as a prime defensive site. A fortress was first established there in 1072, with the present keep being built in the 14th century.

In the Middle Ages the whole peninsula was known as "the castle" and was enclosed by a wall. Parts of the wall can still be seen in the grounds of the Bailey colleges of Durham University and to the west of the Cathedral; these walls are Grade I listed. Along the inside of the wall on the east side ran a street. This road still exists and forms the present North and South Bailey. At its southern end, the street is still cobbled and is widely regarded as among the most attractive streets in the city.

The central and southern parts of The Bailey, including the Castle, the Cathedral, the College, and Prebends Bridge, are now designated a World Heritage Site.

References
Margot Johnson. "The Peninsula" in Durham: Historic and University City and surrounding area. Sixth Edition. Turnstone Ventures. 1992. . Pages 1 to 8. See particularly "South Bailey" (including article on "North Bailey") at page 8. Also "The Borough of Durham" at pages 9 to 11.

Notes

Areas of Durham, England
Durham University